Bookaboo is a children's television series created and produced by Lucy Goodman of Happy Films and co-directed by Ian Emes. The show features puppets, celebrities, picture books, songs and animation. The recurring protagonist is a world famous rock puppy who tours the world with his band. Lucy Goodman created the show after researching the current global decline in parental reading in the home. Bookaboo is created with the intent to inspire more children and grown ups to have fun sharing books together. Bookaboo is streamed on Amazon Video in the United Kingdom, and broadcast on ABC2 in Australia, CBC Television in Canada and Amazon Video in the United States.

Format
"A story a day or I just can't play!" says world-famous, drum-playing rock puppy, Bookaboo as he flounces off stage. The rest of the band (Growler on Bass Guitar, Paws on Keyboards) find Bookaboo on the Bookabus, ignoring all stage calls and engaged in the most extraordinary stage avoidance schemes (comedy sketches & songs).

Despite their best efforts the band fail to persuade the rock pup back to the stadium. Luckily, a celebrity fan arrives with a picture book filled 'Bookabag' and settles down to share it. Bookaboo is mesmerised and enthralled by the story. It appears to cure his little 'problem'. As the book finishes, Bookaboo gets his rhythm (he calls it his 'Bojo') back.

With the celebrity fan cheering him on from the wings, Bookaboo delights the crowds with a canine drum solo. As the episode draws to an end, an electrified stage sign behind Bookaboo lets the grown up audience know: "1000 books per episode are donated to children who need them most".

Featured Books
Books featured in the show are carefully selected from approximately 500 that are submitted each series by publishers across the UK. Selection criteria are simple – books must be truly enjoyable to share aloud for both children and adults.

Celebrities
A wide variety of celebrities are invited to take part in the show to encourage grown-ups from the broadest areas of society to share books with children. Celebrities have included pop stars (Melanie C, Meat Loaf, Alesha Dixon) and Grime star Lethal Bizzle. Sportsmen and women have also supported Bookaboo's campaign to get more grown-ups sharing books, including a former goalkeeper for England (David Seaman), boxer Ricky Hatton and wrestler (Adam Copeland).

Actors and Actresses (Michael Sheen, Emilia Fox, Stana Katic), Presenters (Paula Abdul, Amanda Holden, Lorraine Kelly) and comedians (Johnny Vegas, Al Murray) have all shared a book with Bookaboo. Celebrities are both young and old, such as EastEnders young star Maisie Smith (eight years old), and Bernard Cribbins (eighty-one years). All celebrities become in effect, Storytime Ambassadors for Bookaboo's "Share A Book Today" campaign and have taken part as a result of their desire to help more children and grown-ups share books together.

Bookaboo Share A Book Today Campaign
By 2011, 26,000 books had been donated to disadvantaged children across the United Kingdom, on behalf of Bookaboo and the publishers and celebrities taking part. In 2009, Bookaboo partnered with Booktrust and The Book People, to enable 13,000 books to be distributed to under six-year-old children in care.

In 2011, Bookaboo partnered with The Pre School Learning Alliance and a further 13,000 books are being distributed to nurseries in areas of disadvantage in the UK.

In 2013, Bookaboo partnered with First Book Canada when Season became a UK/Canadian co-production and in 2016 when the show premiered as an Amazon Original in the US, First Book US became the charity partner.

Characters

The Story behind the band
All current members of Bookaboo's band met in the dog rescue centre as orphaned puppies. Their talent for music was uncovered by the centre owner and as a result they entered and won canine talent contest 'Pup Idol'. The puppy band set out to tour the globe on their tour bus, a converted library truck called the Bookabus and play to packed out stadiums around the world.

Bookaboo
Bookaboo is a world-famous rock dog and legendary canine drummer. But Bookaboo has a little problem. Bookaboo loses his 'bojo' (his rhythm) and cannot play unless he has been able to share a book with someone, hence his famous line "A story a day or I just can't play".

Marcus Clarke is the puppeteer. The Bookaboo puppet was designed by Paul Andrejco and was built by Puppet Heap in Hoboken, NJ.

Growler
Growler is an American hound and talented bass guitarist. Growler has a particularly low voice and oddly pitched howl and growl. A backstory to be released reveals why he got called Growler. Growler was introduced in Series 2 United Kingdom. He was designed and built by Puppet Heap and is puppeteered by Paul Andrecjo.

Paws
Paws is a talented and extremely dexterous Dachshund keyboard player. To date, Paws has played keyboards and key-tar. Paws was designed and built by Puppet Heap, and is puppeteered in the United Kingdom by Brian Herring.

Music
The titles music, all of the songs and the majority of the incidental music is written, composed and mostly played by Mark Dyson.

Bookaboo's drum solo is performed by Alex Toff who also puppeteered Bookaboo's arms for his drum solo. Alex Toff whilst dressed up in a lycra chromakey green body fitting suit, described the job as 'the weirdest session he'd ever done'.

Songs to date include:

 'Bookaboo's Book Blues' – Bookaboo sings the Blues
 'Sausages' – Growler rocks about his love of sausages
 'Hey You Make Some Noise' – Anthem includes the line "if you rock with the pups then you're part of the band"
 'Life on the Road'- ballad

Merchandising
A pop-up book complete with sound chip called 'Pup Idol' is published by Walker Books in the United Kingdom and Australia. Two stories about their life on the road, "Puppies in the Pound" and "Dogs in Disguise" are published by Walker Books in the United Kingdom and Australia together with two activity books. DVD's of the show are available in the United Kingdom (Abbey Media) and Australia (Fremantle).

Background
In November 2008, ITV announced their commission of a part live action, and part animated series, to promote child and adult literacy in the United Kingdom, in support of the National Year of Reading 2008. Bookaboo was commissioned by Emma Tennant, Controller of CITV and ITV3. The series, created and produced by Lucy Goodman will be directed by Lucy Goodman and Ian Emes for Happy Films. Tennant also acts as the executive producer for ITV.

The thirteen part CITV series launched on Monday 2 March 2009, on the CITV channel and originally aired three times a day, broadcast every weekday at 12:15, 15:20 and 17:45.

In January 2009, ITV announced that alongside the series there will an online Bookaboo Book Club, live events and in store promotions. The show won the Preschool Live Action BAFTA, for the 2009 British Academy Children's Awards. A second series began airing from 1 November 2010, airing on both the CITV digital channel and ITV. It also introduces Bookaboo's bandmates, Growler and Paws.

Awards and nominations
The first series won the Children's BAFTA Award for 'Best Pre-School Live Action' programme in 2009. The second series received the same award title in 2011. In 2009, Lucy Goodman and Ian Emes received an RTS nomination. Bookaboo has since gone onto win the 2010 Broadcast Award for Best Children's Programme, and the 2010 International Prix Jeunesse Award, in Munich. In 2012, Bookaboo was awarded a British Animation Award, in the mixed media category, and was finalist in Children's Choice category. In 2017, Bookaboo was nominated for 5 Daytime Emmy's and won the Parent's Choice Silver Honour Award.

References

External links
 Happy Films Website
 Canadian episodes

ITV children's television shows
CBC Kids original programming
2009 British television series debuts
2000s British children's television series
2010 British television series endings
2010s British children's television series
2013 Canadian television series debuts
2013 Canadian television series endings
2010s Canadian children's television series
British television series with live action and animation
British television shows featuring puppetry
Canadian television series with live action and animation
Canadian television shows featuring puppetry
Television series by Fremantle (company)
Television shows about dogs